Pavlovskoye is a rural locality (a selo) in Nebylovskoye Rural Settlement, Yuryev-Polsky District, Vladimir Oblast, Russia. The population was 9 as of 2010. There are 5 streets.

Geography 
Pavlovskoye is located on the Kuftiga River, 40 km southeast of Yuryev-Polsky (the district's administrative centre) by road. Bukholovo is the nearest rural locality.

References 

Rural localities in Yuryev-Polsky District
Vladimirsky Uyezd